The Raid on Saint John took place on 27 August 1775 during the American Revolutionary War. The raid involved American privateers from Machias, Maine attacking Saint John, Nova Scotia (present day New Brunswick). The privateers intended to stop the export of supplies being sent to the loyalists in Boston. This raid was the first hostile act committed against Nova Scotia and it resulted in raising the militia across the colony.

Background
During the American Revolution, Americans regularly attacked Nova Scotia by land and sea. American privateers devastated the maritime economy by raiding many of the coastal communities, such as the numerous raids on Liverpool and on Annapolis Royal.<ref>Roger Marsters (2004). Bold Privateers: Terror, Plunder and Profit on Canada's Atlantic Coast" , p. 87-89</ref>

In June 1775, the Americans had their first naval victory over the British in the Battle of Machias. In response to this defeat, in July 1775, the British sent two armed sloops, Diligence and Tatamacouche from Halifax to punish the Americans. On 12 July 1775, the British vessels confronted O'Brien in Unity and Portland Packet in the Bay of Fundy, where the Americans took the British ships.  The Machias Committee of Safety sent Captain Stephen Smith to capture the brig Loyal Briton at St. John, which was loading cattle and other supplies for the Army at Boston.

Battle

On 27 August 1775, Captain Stephen Smith, in a 4-gun American privateer from Machias, along with 40 men raided St. John and burned Fort Frederick and took the brig Loyal Briton under the command of Captain Frederick Sterling. The brig had 120 tonnes of sheep and oxen for the British forces in Boston. He also took a corporal and two privates, with two women and five children prisoner. John Anderson Esqr was also on board the brig. The brigantine was owned by John Sempill (Semple) and the navigator was David Ross, who both escaped. The prisoners were released at Boston and sent back to St. John.

Aftermath
Captain Edward Le Cras of HMS Somerset and HMS Tartar proceeded immediately to Annapolis Royal to protect the town. The Governor requested two sloops-of-war to patrol the Bay of Fundy. Admiral Samuel Graves assigned Captain William Duddingston of HMS Senegal'' to the task. Graves also sent Le Cras to protect Halifax for the winter. Governor Legge of Nova Scotia also called up militias from across the colony to be stood up.

In retaliation for the raid on St. John, the British executed the Burning of Falmouth. American privateers remained a threat to Nova Scotian ports for the rest of the war.

See also
 
 Military history of Nova Scotia

Notes

References
Primary Sources
Documentary history of the State of Maine. Letters of the Committee of Safety at Machias, Vol. 14, p. 310

St. John
St. John
Privateering in the American Revolutionary War
St. John
Maritime history of Canada
Military history of Nova Scotia
Military history of New England
1775 in Nova Scotia
St. John